Johnny Rhodes may refer to:
Johnny Rhodes (rugby league) (born 1947), Australian rugby league footballer
Johnny Rhodes (basketball), American basketball player in Maryland Terrapins men's basketball
Johnny Rhodes, presenter on KGRR

See also
John Rhodes (disambiguation)